The Union Steamship Company of British Columbia was a pioneer firm on coastal British Columbia. It was founded in November 1889 by John Darling, a director of the Union Steamship Company of New Zealand, and nine local businessmen. The company began by offering local service on Burrard Inlet near Vancouver and later expanded to servicing the entire British Columbia coast.

The Union Steamship Company was bought out by the Canadian Pacific Steamship Company in 1948.  The  fire in Toronto forced the Federal Maritime Department to change marine regulations regarding wooden passenger vessels, while the nature of the BC coastal fleet changed more to freight and a tug and barge operation. The Union Steamships ran until 1956 when a strike finished the fleet.

Company organized
Union Steamship had its origins in the Burrard’s Inlet Towing Company, whose original principals were Alfred N.C. King, Hugh Stalker, John Morton, and Capt. Donald McPhaiden.  The fleet upon formation consisted of three smaller wooden-hulled steamers: Leonora, Senator, and, the largest of the three, the steam tug Skidegate.

1890 to 1896
Cutch, 324 GT, was the first steamer the company acquired after its initial incorporation.  Cutch had been built at Hull, England in 1884.  Capt. William Webster, one of the founders of Union Steamship, located Cutch in India, where it had been in service as a maharaja’s yacht.  Webster purchased the steamer with funds raised in England by John Darling.  Webster brought Cutch from India to British Columbia, arriving in Vancouver in June 1890.  Cutch was placed on the run from Vancouver to Nanaimo, British Columbia.

Capilano 1 and Coquitlam were built in Glasgow, Scotland and shipped to British Columbia in a knocked-down condition, then reassembled on the beach near present-day Stanley Park.  Capilano 1 was launched in December 1891, and Coquitlam followed in April 1892.

1897 to 1906

Gold rush transportation
In 1897 the Klondike Gold Rush created a demand for transportation.  To meet the demand, both Capilano 1 and Coquitlam were outfitted with crude berths for passengers, and then run north to the mouth of the Yukon River.  Capilano 1 left in late July and Coquitlam in early August.  They were the first British vessels to proceed directly to the mouth of the Yukon from Vancouver.

In 1898 Union Steamship placed Capilano 1, Coquitlam, and Cutch in service to Skagway and Dyea, in southeast Alaska.  Skagway and Dyea were the principal disembarkation point for traffic bound for the Klondike gold fields.  These three steamers remained in the Skagway/Dyea service in 1899.

Skidegate scrapped and Cutch wrecked
The company’s old steam tug Skidegate was scrapped in Vancouver in 1900.  Also in 1900, the company’s first steamer purchase, Cutch, was wrecked, on August 24, and sold for salvage.

Coutli and Camosun added to fleet
In 1904 the company built the steam tug Coutli, 99 GT,  LOA, for use in log towing service for British Columbia Mills Co.

In 1905 the company placed Camosun into service.  Camosun, 1,369 GT,  LOA, was a steel-hulled modern vessel built at Paisley, Scotland by the Bow, McLachlan concern.  Camosun could carry 54 persons overnight, with room for 120 deck passengers.  Camosun arrived from Scotland in Vancouver on June 30, 1905 and was placed in service on a weekly route to Prince Rupert, BC under Capt. F. Saunders.

1907 to 1911

Cowichen, Cheslakee, and Inlander added to fleet
In 1908 Union Steamship added Cowichan, 962 GT,  LOA, to its fleet.  Cowichan, an all-steel vessel with twin propellers, was built in Troon, Scotland by Ailsa Shipbuilding Co.  Cowichan was licensed to carry 165 passengers and 125 tons of freight.  It was used in the company’s service to logging camps.

Cheslakee, 526 GT,  LOA, was completed for the company in 1910 by an Irish concern, Dublin Dockyard Co.  Built to the highest standards, the twin-propeller all-steel Cheslakee was intended to run out of Vancouver in passenger service on northern routes.  Cheslakee could carry only a limited amount of freight, which was restricted to perishable items such as butter, fruit and fish.  Passenger accommodations were large for a vessel of this size.

Also in 1910 the company invested in the river sternwheeler Inlander.  Inlander ran for three seasons, 1910 to 1912, on the Skeena River.

Welsford & Company buys control of the company
In 1911 Welsford & Company, a Liverpool shipping line, purchased a controlling interest in Union Steamship Co.  Also in 1911, on September 23, the Welsford company purchased the Boscowitz Steamship Co., Ltd., of Victoria, BC, for $160,000, half in cash and half in Union Steamship stock.

1912 to 1918
The start of World War I caused economic disruption and a fall off in the British Columbia salmon fishery, impacting the company’s operations so much that one-half of its fleet was taken out of service.  This soon changed, when wartime production demands generated an unprecedented surge in business.

Loss of ships in 1913 and 1914

On June 7, 1913, disaster struck when Cheslakee capsized at its dock in Van Anda, on Texada Island, drowning several people.

The company lost two ships in 1914.  On February 3, 1914 the company’s freighter Vadso, running a few hours out of Port Simpson, struck an uncharted rock, caught fire, and sank.  There were no casualties among the crew, but they had to row twelve miles to the Arrandale Cannery, from whence they were able to return to Vancouver on board another company freighter, Venture.  Later in 1914 Capilano 1 stranded in Malaspina Strait and became a total loss, but also with no casualties to anyone on board.

Purchase of the All-Red Line
The All-Red Line had been running local service from Vancouver to Powell River with the steamers Selma and Santa Maria.  The All-Red Line also owned property at Selma Park, on the Sunshine Coast of British Columbia, near the town of Sechelt.  In 1917 Union Steamship purchased the All-Red Line, including all of its floating equipment and the property at Selma Park.  Union Steamship renamed Selma as Chasina, and Santa Maria as Chilco.   Union Steamship later developed Selma Park as an excursion destination resort.

1919 to 1924

Post-war expansion program
After World War I, the company, under manager Ernest H Beasley (or Beasley) (d.1920), began an expansion program.  The automobile had not yet been able reach most of the points served by the company’s steamers.  The company carried freight and passengers to new pulp mills at Powell River, Ocean Falls, and Swanson Bay.  The company also provided service to the Granby Copper Mine at Anyox, the gold mine at Surf Inlet (now Port Belmont), and the many coastal logging camps.

Death of company manager Beazley
There were periodic labor disputes in the Canadian shipping business after World War 1.
In May 1920 company manager Ernest H. Beazley was killed in an airplane crash at Minoru Park.  Beazley had just settled a labor strike, and was taking a brief vacation.  John Barnsley (d.1924), who had joined the company when the Boscowitz shipping concern was acquired, then became general manager, and R.A.H. Welsford came to British Columbia from Liverpool to act as managing director.

Two freighters purchased
In 1919 Union Steamship bought the freighter British Columbia from Griffiths, renamed it Chilliwack, and used it to replace the 1891 steamer Comox.  Comox was first resold for scrap, but soon sold again to a Central American concern and renamed Alejandro.

The company also had the steel freighter Chilkoot 1 built in 1920 by Wallace Shipbuilding Co.  Chilkoot 1 remained in service for a long time, being operated in 1966 by Northland Navigation Co. under the name Alaska Prince.

Day excursion business developed
Union Steamship continued to develop the day excursion business which had begun in 1917 with the acquisition of the All-Red line.  In 1920, the company had the wooden steamer Capilano 2 built at B.C. Marine Ways, using engines from the Puget Sound steamer Washington.  Capilano 2 was intended to serve the resort at Selma Park, formerly owned by the All-Red Line.

Lady Alexandra, completed at Montrose, Scotland was the most important addition to shipping in the Pacific Northwest in 1924.  Alexandra was a two-stack steamer of 1,396 GT and 230 feet, capable of carrying 1200 passengers on day excursions.  During the approximately 30 years Alexandra was in service, the steamer seldom left Howe Sound, and was mostly used during the summer months, including especially cruises to Bowen Island.

Terminal Steam Navigation purchased
In December 1920, Union Steamships bought the Terminal Steam Navigation Company from the veteran shipping man Capt. John Andrew “Jack” Cates for a price of about $250,000.  The sale included the Bowen Island property of Terminal Steam, the wooden steamer Bowena, and the route up East Howe Sound to Squamish.

The deal was to have included the steamer Ballena, but before the sale was finalized, Ballena was destroyed by fire while alongside the Union dock in Vancouver, killing a coal stoker.  Bowena also sustained $15,000 damage from the same fire.  Following repair, Bowena was renamed Cheam, and placed in service on the Bowen Island route in May, 1921.

Cardena added to fleet
In 1923 Cardena 1559 GT 223 ft, was completed at Glasgow, Scotland for Union Steamship, which placed the new vessel on a route running from Vancouver to Prince Rupert, and then to Stewart, British Columbia.

1925 to 1929

Celicia, Cynthia, and Catala added to fleet
In 1925 Union Steamships added three new steamers to its fleet, Lady Cecilia, Lady Cynthia, and Catala.  All were built by the same firm, Coaster Construction Co, at Montrose, Scotland.  Catala was an entirely new vessel, intended for northern service.

Cecilia and Cynthia had been rebuilt from Royal Navy minesweepers.  They each had to be sponsoned out to improve their stability, but this reduced their speed from 19 to 15 knots.  Cecilia and Cynthia, each about 950 GT, were fitted to carry 800 passengers and 75 tons of freight on Howe Sound routes and to Powell River.  In later years Cynthia received substantial alterations for logging camp service.

Collision between Lady Cynthia and Cowichan
On December 27, 1925, Lady Cynthia collided with and sank another Union company ship, [[Cowichan (steamship)|Cowichan’’]].   Lady Cecilia had brought a Christmas excursion from Powell River to Vancouver.  More people wanted to come south than Cecilia could carry, so Harold Brown, the company's general manager, ordered Cynthia to embark an additional 200 passengers, after which Cynthia departed southbound for Vancouver.

Meanwhile, northbound Cowichan encountered fog off Roberts Creek.  Knowing Cecilia would be coming, Cowichan’s Captain Robert Wilson, proceeded slowly, listened carefully for Cecilias whistle.  Cecilia passed safely by, but then Wilson was taken by surprise 15 minutes later when Cynthia, under Capt. John Boden appeared out of the fog, colliding with its bow into Cowichan’s amidships.

Boden kept Cynthia’s bow in place to keep Cowichan from sinking.  Wilson, the last to leave his ship, first helped all 45 people on Cowichan to board Cynthia  When Cecila backed away, Cowichan sank almost immediately.

1938 to 1945
Waterhouse concern acquired
In 1939 Union Steamship bought the ships and freighting interests of the Frank L. Waterhouse Co., which had been in the cannery service business for many years.  Vessels acquired were three freighters directly owned by Waterhouse, Northholm, Southholm, and Eastholm, and three more under charter, Gray, Bervin, and Salvor which was same vessel as the company’s old 1891 Coquitlam.

The Waterhouse acquisitions were operated as a separate division of Union Steamships, under the management of R.L. Solloway.  Acquisition of the Waterhouse freighters brought the Union Steamship fleet to a total of 16 vessels.  At this time, all shipping on the Canadian west coast was operating under war time conditions, meaning blacked-out portholes, minimum lights, radio silence and in many cases, carrying guns manned by naval personnel.

Northholm lost in a storm
On January 16, 1943, the freighter Northholm was sunk in a storm off the west coast of Vancouver Island.  Northholm was struck by heavy seas, and sunk so quickly that nine men went down with the ship.  Eight men managed to escape the vessel, but of these, six later drowned, leaving the first officer and a seaman as the only survivors.

1946 to 1950
Surplus warships acquired and converted
After World War II Union Steamships resumed regular weekly service to Ketchikan, Alaska after a lapse of many years, including stops en route at Prince Rupert and Ocean Falls.  To serve the route, the company had acquired three British-built corvettes, HMCS Leaside, HMS St. Thomas, and HMS Hespeler, and converted them into civilian passenger vessels Coquitlam 2, Camosun 3, and Chilcotin, respectively.  Originally the company intended to run on the route year-round, but winter traffic proved to be insufficient, so in December 1947 the Ketchikan run became seasonal only.

Chelosin stranded and sold to salvors
On November 4, 1949 Chelosin stranded off Siwash Rock near the entrance to Vancouver Harbor.  The company could not pull the ship off, and it was sold to salvors for $1,500.  All passengers and crew were safely evacuated from the vessel.  Victor David, who had bought Chelosin'', surprised everyone when he and a five-man salvage crew were able to quickly refloat the ship and take it into a dock.

List of vessels

Notes

Vessels

Sources

References
 
 
 
 

 
Transport companies established in 1889
Transport companies disestablished in 1956
Defunct shipping companies of Canada
1889 establishments in British Columbia
Canadian companies established in 1889
1956 disestablishments in British Columbia